Longstreth is an unincorporated community in Hocking County, in the U.S. state of Ohio.

History
A post office called Longstreth was established in 1890, and remained in operation until 1923.

References

Unincorporated communities in Hocking County, Ohio
Unincorporated communities in Ohio